Micah Maʻa (born April 16, 1997) is an American volleyball player. He is a member of the US national team. At the professional club level, he plays for Halkbank Ankara.

Personal life
Maa was born in Kāneohe, Hawaii to Pono and Lisa Strand-Maa.

Career
Maa was a standout 3 sport athlete at Punahou winning a state basketball title in 2012, a state football title in 2013, four state volleyball titles and earning the Hawaii state volleyball player of the year his senior season in 2015 at Punahou. At UCLA he earned AVCA first-team All-America, first team All-MPSF and Off the Block's Server of the Year in his freshman season in 2016, all 2018 NCAA volleyball tournament honors when the Bruins finished runner-up in the championship game against the 49ers of Long Beach State, and AVCA first-team All-America, first-team All-MPSF, setting the UCLA Bruins single-season record of 67 aces his senior season in 2019. He graduated from UCLA in 2019 with a major in political science.

2022–23 CEV Champions League is his debut in Champions League with Halkbank ANKARA.

Sporting achievements

College
 National championships
 2018  NCAA national championship, with UCLA Bruins

Clubs
 National championships
 2019/2020  French Cup, with Stade Poitevin Poitiers

Youth national team
 2014  NORCECA U19 Championship

Individual awards
 2014: NORCECA U19 Championship – Best Setter
 2016: AVCA First-Team All-American
 2018: AVCA First-Team All-American
 2018: NCAA national championship – All–Tournament Team
 2019: AVCA First-Team All-American

References

External links
 Player profile at TeamUSA.org
 Player profile at PlusLiga.pl 
 Player profile at Volleybox.net
 UCLA Bruins 2019 roster – Micah Maʻa

1997 births
Living people
People from Hawaii
American men's volleyball players
American expatriate sportspeople in France
Expatriate volleyball players in France
American expatriate sportspeople in Poland
Expatriate volleyball players in Poland
American expatriate sportspeople in Turkey
Expatriate volleyball players in Turkey
UCLA Bruins men's volleyball players
GKS Katowice (volleyball) players
Halkbank volleyball players
Setters (volleyball)
Outside hitters